Nikiforos Fokas is a former municipality in the Rethymno regional unit, Crete, Greece. Since the 2011 local government reform it is part of the municipality Rethymno, of which it is a municipal unit. It was named after the 10th century Byzantine Emperor Nikephoros II Phokas, who retook the island from the Muslims. Population 8,911 (2011). The seat of the municipality was in Gonia. The ancient city of Eleutherna is located within the municipal unit.

References

Populated places in Rethymno (regional unit)